Moiben is the principal town of Moiben Constituency.

Moiben may also refer to:

Moiben Constituency, an area of Uasin Gishu County in Kenya

Surname
James Moiben (born 1977), Kenyan marathon runner and winner of the 2004 Beijing Marathon
Laban Moiben (born 1983), Kenyan marathon runner and three-time winner of the Los Angeles Marathon

Kenyan names